The common Puerto Rican ameiva or Puerto Rican ground lizard (Pholidoscelis exsul) is a species of lizard in the whiptail family.

Geographic range
Ameiva exsul is found in coastal habitats of Puerto Rico, the United States Virgin Islands, the British Virgin Islands, and Isla Culebra. The species is also found in the Toro Negro State Forest.

Description

Color patterns vary widely among individuals, populations, and islands. Animals are predominantly colored gray, black, or brown, with large or small white dots along their backs. Dorsolateral stripes vary in number, length, and color. All individuals have a white or blue-white mottled stomach. The chin shield and throat patch are often light pink. Juveniles generally have a bright blue tail and more dots than stripes.

Biology
Puerto Rican ground lizards occur in habitat with open canopy structure and loose sandy soil in elevations between sea-level and  where the temperature is above 24 °C (75 °F) year-round. Ground lizards forage for insects and small fruits and scavenge for dead animals or trash scraps in urban areas.

Reproduction
Juveniles may have a bright blue tail, like the closely related Pholidoscelis wetmorei (blue-tailed ground lizard), but they will lose the bright blue color in their tail with age. Individuals can live more than six years.

Threats
The principle threat to individuals of P. exsul is from other animals which eat ground lizards. Mammalian predators include feral cats, dogs, and small Indian mongooses. Avian predators include American kestrels, Greater Antillean grackles, and pearly-eyed thrashers.

References

Further reading
Boulenger GA (1896). "Ueber einige Reptilien von der Insel Mona (Westindien) ". Jahresbericht und Abhandlungen des Naturwissenschaftlichen Vereins in Magdeburg 1894-1896: 112-114. (Ameiva alboguttata, new species, pp. 112–113). (in German).
Cope ED (1862). "Synopsis of the Species of Holcosus and Ameiva, with Diagnoses of new West Indian and South American Colubridæ". Proc. Acad. Nat. Sci. Philadelphia 14: 60-82. (Ameiva plei Var. exsul, new variation, p. 66).
Heatwole H, Torres F (1967). "Distribution and Geographic Variation of the Ameivas of Puerto Rico and the Virgin Islands". Studies on the Fauna of Curaçao and other Caribbean Islands 24 (92): 63-111. (Ameiva desechensis, new species, pp. 95–96).
Schwartz A, Thomas R (1975). A Check-list of West Indian Amphibians and Reptiles. Carnegie Museum of Natural History Special Publication No. 1. Pittsburgh, Pennsylvania: Carnegie Museum of Natural History. 216 pp. (Ameiva exsul, pp. 58–59).

exsul
Reptiles of the Caribbean
Reptiles of Puerto Rico
Reptiles described in 1862
Taxa named by Edward Drinker Cope